The Arizona Coyotes are an American professional ice hockey team based in Glendale, Arizona. They play in the Pacific Division of the Western Conference in the National Hockey League (NHL). The team started out as a charter member of the World Hockey Association (WHA), and were named the Winnipeg Jets. The WHA then merged with the NHL in 1979, the Jets relocated to Phoenix in 1996, and were renamed the Phoenix Coyotes. The franchise has had eight general managers since entering the NHL.

Key

General managers

See also
List of NHL general managers

Notes
 A running total of the number of general managers of the franchise. Thus any general manager who has two or more separate terms as general manager is only counted once. WHA general managers are not counted towards the total.

References

General managers
Arizona Coyotes
Arizona Coyotes general managers
general